The following is a list of mayors of the city of Dakar, Senegal. Senegal was under French colonial rule until April 1960.

 Jean Alexandre, circa 1887
 Charles De Margueritte Monfort, circa 1892
 Jean Alexandre, circa 1896
 Fernand Marsat, 1898-1908
 Edmond Teisseire, circa 1903-1906
 André Masson, circa 1908
 Lavie, circa 1919
 Blaise Diagne, 1920-1934
 Jules Sergent, circa 1921
 Armand-Pierre Angrand, 1934-1939
 Martine, circa 1939
 Alfred Goux, 1943-1945
 Lamine Guèye, 1945-1961
 Joseph Gomis, 1961-1964
 Samba Guèye, 1964-1978
 Lamine Diack, 1978-1979
 Amadou Clédor Sall, 1979-1984
 Mamadou Diop, 1984-2002
 Pape Diop, 2002-2009
 Khalifa Ababacar Sall, 2009 to 2018.
 Soham El Wardini, 2018 to present.
 Barthélémy toy diaz 2022 present mayor

See also
 Timeline of Dakar
 Quatre Communes
 List of mayors of Saint-Louis, Senegal

References

This article incorporates information from the French Wikipedia.

Bibliography
  

 
dakar
dakar